The John W. Bennett House is a historic two-story house in Brownville, Nebraska. It was built in 1868 as an I-house for John W. Bennett, a farmer from Kentucky. It is "the oldest, dated example of the
I-house in Nebraska." It has been listed on the National Register of Historic Places since September 16, 1983.

References

External links

		
National Register of Historic Places in Nemaha County, Nebraska
Houses completed in 1868
I-houses
1868 establishments in Nebraska